In algebraic geometry, the Ramanujam–Samuel theorem gives conditions for a divisor of a local ring to be principal.

Statement

Grothendieck's version of the Ramanujam–Samuel theorem  is as follows.
Suppose that A is a local Noetherian ring with maximal ideal m, whose completion is integral and integrally closed, and ρ is a local homomorphism from A to a local Noetherian ring B of larger dimension such that B is formally smooth over A and the residue field of B is finite over that of A. Then a cycle of codimension 1 in Spec(B) that is principal at the point mB is principal.

References

Theorems in algebraic geometry